The term Melkite, also written Melchite, refers to various Eastern Christian churches of the Byzantine Rite and their members originating in the Middle East. The term comes from the common Central Semitic root m-l-k, meaning "royal", and by extension "imperial" or loyal to the Byzantine Emperor. The term acquired religious connotations as denominational designation for those Christians who accepted imperial religious policies, based on Christological resolutions of the Council of Chalcedon (451).

Originally, during the Early Middle Ages, Melkites used both Greek and Aramaic language in their religious life, and initially employed the Antiochian rite in their liturgy, but later (10th-11th century) accepted Constantinopolitan rite, and incorporated Arabic in parts of their liturgical practices.

When used in denominational terminology, Melkite designations can have two distinctive meanings. The term Orthodox Melkites thus refers to the Greek Orthodox Christians of the Near East, while the term Catholic Melkites refers to adherents of the Melkite Catholic Church. Melkite designations do not have implicit ethnic connotations, but they are used as denominational components of complex terms, mainly in scholarly ethnoreligious terminology.

Background

Melkites view themselves as the first Christian community, dating the Melkite Church back to the time of the Apostles. According notably to Vatican historiographers and the Ecumenical Patriarchate of Constantinople, this first community is said to have been a mixed one made up of individuals who were Greek, Roman, Syriac, and Jewish. Secular historians like Edward Gibbon and Ernest Renan held similar views regarding the emergence of the Melkite community.

The emergence of Christological controversies in the first half of the 5th century gave rise to divisions among Eastern Christians in various regions of the Near East. Official state support, provided by the Byzantine imperial government to adherents of Chalcedonian Christianity (451), provided the base for a specific use of Aramaic terms that designated those who were loyal to the empire, not just in regard to their political loyalty, but also in relation to their acceptance of imperial religious policies. Throughout the Near East, all Christians who accepted state-backed Chalcedonian Christianity, became known as Melkites, a term derived from the Hebrew word melk (similar to Aramaic melek) (ruler, king, emperor), thus designating those who are loyal to the empire and its officially imposed religious policies.

The very term (Melkites) designated all loyalists, regardless of their ethnicity (Greeks, Hellenized Jews, Arameans...), thus including not only Greek-speaking Chalcedonians, but also those among Aramaic-speaking and Arabic-speaking Christians and Judeo-Christians who were followers of Chalcedonian Christianity. All pro-Chalcedonian Christians throughout Byzantine Syria, Byzantine Phoenicia, Byzantine Palestine and Byzantine Egypt thus became commonly known as Melkites. Since Melkite communities were dominated by Greek episcopate, position of Aramaic/Syriac-speaking and Arabic-speaking Melkites within the wider Melkite community was somewhat secondary to that of Greek Melkites. That led to the gradual decline of Aramaic/Syriac traditions, that were originally represented by theological literature created in Christian-Palestinian Aramaic language, also known as Melkite Aramaic. The decline of Aramaic/Syriac traditions among Melkites was enhanced (since the 7th century) by gradual Arabization, that also affected Greek-speaking Melkite communities, since under the Islamic rule Arabic became the main language of public life and administration.

Orthodox Melkites

Internal divisions that emerged after the Council Chalcedon (451) in eastern patriarchates of Alexandria, Antioch, and Jerusalem, gradually led to the creation of distinctive pro-Chalcedonian (Melkite) and non-Chalcedonian branches, that by the beginning of the 6th century evolved into separate hierarchical structures.

Chalcedonian (Melkite) patriarchates of Alexandria, Antioch, and Jerusalem remained in communion with the Ecumenical Patriarchate of Constantinople. On the other side, among miaphysite non-Chalcedonians, parallel patriarchates emerged in Alexandria (miaphysite Coptic Church) and Antioch (miaphysite Syriac Church). In Byzantine Palestine, pro-Chalcedonian (Melkite) party prevailed, as well as in some other regions, like the Nubian kingdom of Makuria (in modern Sudan), that was also Chalcedonian, in contrast to their non-Chalcedonian Ethiopian Tewahedo neighbours, from  until c. 710 and still had a large Melkite minority until the 15th century.

Main Melkite Orthodox Churches are:
 Greek Orthodox Patriarchate of Alexandria 
 Greek Orthodox Patriarchate of Antioch 
 Greek Orthodox Patriarchate of Jerusalem

Some typically Grecian "ancient synagogal" priestly rites and hymns have survived partially to the present, notably in the distinct church services of the Melkite and Greek Orthodox communities of the Hatay Province of Southern Turkey, Syria and Lebanon. Members of these communities still call themselves , which literally means "Eastern Romans" in Arabic (that is, those of the Eastern Roman Empire, what English speakers often call "Byzantines").

Catholic Melkites

From 1342, Roman Catholic clergy were based in Damascus and other areas, and worked toward a union between Rome and the Orthodox. At that time, the nature of the East-West Schism, normally dated to 1054, was undefined, and many of those who continued to worship and work within the Melkite Church became identified as a pro-Western party. In 1724, Cyril VI (Seraphim Tanas) was elected in Damascus by the Synod as Patriarch of Antioch. Considering this to be a Catholic takeover attempt, Jeremias III of Constantinople imposed a deacon, the Greek monk Sylvester to rule the patriarchate instead of Cyril. After being ordained a priest, then bishop, he was given Turkish protection to overthrow Cyril. Sylvester's heavy-handed leadership of the church encouraged many to re-examine the validity of Cyril's claim to the patriarchal throne.

The newly elected Pope Benedict XIII (1724–1730) also recognised the legitimacy of Cyril's claim and recognized him and his followers as being in communion with Rome. From that point onwards, the Melkite Church was divided between the Greek Orthodox (Greek Orthodox Church of Antioch), who continued to be appointed by the authority of the patriarch of Constantinople until the late 19th century, and the Greek Catholics (Melkite Greek Catholic Church), who recognize the authority of the pope of Rome. However, it is now only the Catholic group who continue to use the title Melkite; thus, in modern usage, the term applies almost exclusively to the Arabic-speaking Greek Catholics from the Middle East.

See also

 Chalcedonian Christianity
 Christian Arabs

Notes

Citations

References

 
 
 
 
 
 
 
 
 
 
 
 
 
 
 
 
 
 
 
 
 

Christian groups in the Middle East
History of Eastern Orthodoxy
History of Eastern Catholicism
Ethnic groups in Lebanon
Ethnic groups in Syria